Lourdes is a 2019 documentary.

Overview
Documentary about the rock of the Grotto of Lourdes that is touched by millions of people in hopes of a miracle.

References

2019 films
French documentary films
2010s French-language films
2019 documentary films
2010s French films